

Season summary
The 2010–11 Victoria Salmon Kings season is the Salmon Kings' 7th and final season in the ECHL.

Standings

Division standings

Conference standings

Schedule and results

Regular season

Playoffs

Player Stats

Skaters

Note: GP = Games played; G = Goals; A = Assists; Pts = Points; +/- = Plus/minus; PIM = Penalty minutes

Goaltenders
Note: GP = Games played; Min = Minutes played; W = Wins; L = Losses; OT = Overtime losses; SOL = Shootout losses; GA = Goals against; GAA= Goals against average; Sv% = Save percentage; SO= Shutouts

†Denotes player spent time with another team before joining Victoria. Stats reflect time with the Salmon Kings only. ‡Denotes player no longer with the team. Stats reflect time with Salmon Kings only.

Professional affiliations

Vancouver Canucks
The Salmon Kings' NHL affiliate based in Vancouver, British Columbia.

Manitoba Moose
The Salmon Kings' AHL affiliate based in Winnipeg, Manitoba.

Victoria Salmon Kings seasons
Victoria
Victoria